Wills Creek is a tributary of the Muskingum River, 92.2 mi (148.4 km) long, in eastern Ohio in the United States.  Via the Muskingum and Ohio Rivers, it is part of the watershed of the Mississippi River.  It drains an area of 853 mi² (2,209 km²).

The United States Board on Geographic Names settled on "Wills Creek" as the stream's name in 1963.  According to the Geographic Names Information System, it has also been known historically as "Cou-wach-en-ink" and as "Will's Creek."

Wills Creek is formed by a confluence of short forks near Pleasant City in southern Guernsey County, and initially flows northwardly through Byesville, Cambridge and Kimbolton.  Near Kimbolton it turns westwardly and flows through southeastern Coshocton and northeastern Muskingum Counties, past Plainfield, to its mouth at the Muskingum River, 8 mi (13 km) south of the city of Coshocton.

Near its mouth, a flood-control dam causes the creek to form Wills Creek Lake.

2005 flood

On January 16, 2005 the Wills Creek Dam  became the only dam in the Army Corps of Engineers Huntington District's history (established 1938) to reach its spillway elevation and have water flow uncontrolled over the top of the spillway.

This extreme event was caused by an average of 5-8 inches of rain falling over Central Indiana and Ohio during January 4–14, 2005. This rain combined with snow melt and saturated ground to produce record breaking runoff. Other reservoirs in the Huntington District also set pool level records, including Alum Creek, Deer Creek, Delaware Lake, Paint Creek, Atwood Lake, Bolivar Dam, Charles Mill Lake, Dillon Lake, Dover Dam and Mohawk Dam.

See also
List of rivers of Ohio

References

Wills Creek
Muskingum River
Rivers of Coshocton County, Ohio
Rivers of Guernsey County, Ohio
Rivers of Muskingum County, Ohio
Wills Creek Lake
Wills Creek Dam
Wills Creek Lake
United States Army Corps of Engineers, Huntington District